Castillo San Felipe del Morro Lighthouse, also known as Faro de Morro Port San Juan Light by the National Register of Historic Places and colloquially Faro del Castillo del Morro and Puerto San Juan Light, is a lighthouse atop the walls of Castillo San Felipe del Morro in Old San Juan. It's the first lighthouse built in Puerto Rico. 

The first Castillo San Felipe del Morro Lighthouse was built in 1846 and exhibited a light using five parabolic reflectors. In 1876, a new octagonal iron tower was constructed atop the walls of the fort . The tower was hit by U.S. artillery fire in the Puerto Rican Campaign of the Spanish–American War on May 12, 1898. The lighthouse was rebuilt in 1899 but developed structural problems and was demolished in 1906. The new and current lighthouse was constructed in 1908 as a Moorish Revival style "square tower on castle". Public admission tours into the tower are held, and the Castillo San Felipe del Morro, along with Castillo San Cristóbal and much of the city walls are part of the San Juan National Historic Site also open to the public.

See also
List of lighthouses in Puerto Rico
Castillo San Felipe del Morro

References

External links

Historic American Buildings Survey in Puerto Rico
Historic American Engineering Record in Puerto Rico
Lighthouses completed in 1846
Lighthouses completed in 1876
Lighthouses on the National Register of Historic Places in Puerto Rico
National Register of Historic Places in San Juan, Puerto Rico
San Juan National Historic Site
Tourist attractions in San Juan, Puerto Rico
Moorish Revival architecture in Puerto Rico
1840s establishments in Puerto Rico
1846 establishments in the Spanish Empire
1908 establishments in Puerto Rico
Lighthouses completed in 1908